Mad Magazine Presents Up the Academy (often shortened to Up the Academy) is a 1980 American comedy film directed by Robert Downey Sr. and starring Wendell Brown, Tommy Citera, Ron Leibman, Harry Teinowitz, Hutch Parker, Ralph Macchio, Tom Poston, King Coleman, and Barbara Bach. The plot concerns the antics of a group of misfits at a military school.

Plot
Four troublemaking young men are assigned to Wienberg Military Academy as punishment for their antics: the heir to an organized crime family, Chooch; a faith healer’s son, Ike; the son of an Arab sheik, Hash; and Oliver, whose governor father is up for re-election. In charge over these new recruits is sadistic Major Vaughn Liceman. Three of the four new recruits establish themselves as troublemakers from the start, but Chooch wants to go straight and focuses on his studies. Short time after they are joined by a new roommate, Rodney, who was expelled from other shools because of his pyromaniac tendencies.

When Oliver’s girlfriend from back home, Candy, ends up enrolled at a nearby girls military school, the recruits plot to sneak out. They succeed, but when they return they find that Liceman knows about everything and even has compromising pictures of Oliver and Candy, which he threatens to use to damage the Governor’s re-election bid. The boys assume Chooch is the snitch, but he discovers Rodney is the guilty party.  In retaliation, the boys hatch a new plan to get dirty photos of Liceman with Candy, and retrieve the original blackmail photos.

The counter-blackmail plan takes place during academy's soccer game.  In the midst of the action, Rodney repents his actions and launches a rocket that destroys Liceman's cabin.  The academy wins the soccer game, and the blackmail plot is foiled.  The movie ends with Liceman chasing Ike, Oliver, Hash, Chooch, Candy, and Rodney while Liceman yells "play it again", playing the scene three times.

Cast

Production
The film was an attempt to cash in on the phenomenal and unexpected success of National Lampoon's Animal House, which was also a film made by a comedy magazine about a group of misfits at college.  In 1983, Mad publisher Bill Gaines explained the genesis of his magazine's involvement in the film to The Comics Journal:

It was directed by Robert Downey Sr., and starred Wendell Brown, Tommy Citera, Harry Teinowitz, Hutch Parker (younger brother of Parker Stevenson), Tom Poston, Barbara Bach, Stacey Nelkin, Ralph Macchio (his screen debut) and King Coleman. The movie was filmed entirely in Salina, Kansas, mostly on the campus of St. John's Military School.

Response 
The film was neither a commercial nor critical success when it was originally released, and was disowned by both the staff of Mad magazine and actor Ron Leibman (who, despite his sizable role, had his name completely removed from the credits and promotional material). Besides paying Warner Bros. $30,000 to remove all references to Mad from the film when it was released on home video, Mads publisher William Gaines issued personal handwritten apologies to every person that wrote the magazine to complain. However, the film developed a small cult following. Following Kinney National's purchase of Mad (and after Gaines' death in 1992), all references to the magazine were reinstated on cable television. In 2006, the original version of the film was issued on DVD. Reflecting on the film, Downey Sr. later referred to it as "one of the worst fucking things in history."

Production notes
 Make up effects artist Rick Baker designed the Alfred E. Neuman masks for the film.
 A young Robert Downey Jr. appears as an extra in some soccer scenes.

References in Mad
 In the tradition of Mad making fun of movies, the magazine spoofed their own film with "Mad Magazine Resents Throw Up the Academy". The parody mainly concerned Ron Leibman's name being removed, and the teenage troublemakers being punished by having to star in the film. Unlike most Mad movie parodies which are often several pages in length, this one was only two (appearing in place of the magazine's usual letters column), as the piece devolved into a series of supposed interoffice memos by the writer, artist and editors, all decrying their role in the parody.  Finally, a fake note said that the entire staff of Mad quit over their shame, and the article was thereby discontinued.
 The statue featuring Alfred E. Neuman with a pigeon on his head is located in Mad's editorial offices.

References

External links
 
 
 
 

1980 films
1980s teen comedy films
American teen comedy films
Films set in boarding schools
Films directed by Robert Downey Sr.
Films set in Kansas
Films shot in Kansas
Mad (magazine)
Military humor in film
Salina, Kansas
1980 comedy films
1980s English-language films
1980s American films